This is a list of lighthouses in Mozambique.

Lighthouses

See also
List of lighthouses in Tanzania (to the north)
List of lighthouses in South Africa (to the south)
 Lists of lighthouses and lightvessels

References

External links

Mozambique
Lighthouses
Lighthouses